The 1908 St. Viator football team represented St. Viator College during the 1908 college football season.

Schedule

References

St. Viator
St. Viator Irish football seasons
1908 in sports in Illinois